The 1932 All-Big Six Conference football team consists of American football players chosen by various organizations for All-Big Six Conference teams for the 1932 college football season.  The selectors for the 1932 season included the Associated Press (AP).

All-Big Six selections

Backs
 Bob Dunlap, Oklahoma (AP-1 [QB])
 Elmer Schaake, Kansas (AP-1 [HB])
 Ralph Graham, Kansas State (AP-1 [HB])
 George Sauer, Nebraska (AP-1 [FB])

Ends
 Steve Hokuf (AP-1)
 Charles Schiele, Nebraska (AP-1)

Tackles
 Corwin Hulbert, Nebraska (AP-1)
 Peter Mehringer, Kansas (AP-1)

Guards
 George Atkeson, Kansas (AP-1)
 Walter Zeckser, Kansas State (AP-1)

Centers
 Lawrence Ely, Nebraska (AP-1)

Key
AP = Associated Press

See also
1932 College Football All-America Team

References

All-Big Six Conference football team
All-Big Eight Conference football teams